The women's 100 metre backstroke event at the 2010 Asian Games took place on 17 November 2010 at Guangzhou Aoti Aquatics Centre.

There were 17 competitors from 13 countries who took part in this event. Three heats were held, the heat in which a swimmer competed did not formally matter for advancement, as the swimmers with the top eight times from the entire field qualified for the finals.

Zhao Jing and Gao Chang from China won the gold and bronze medal respectively, Japanese swimmer Shiho Sakai won the silver medal.

Schedule
All times are China Standard Time (UTC+08:00)

Records

Results

Heats

Final

References

 16th Asian Games Results

External links 
 Women's 100m Backstroke Heats Official Website
 Women's 100m Backstroke Ev.No.31 Final Official Website

Swimming at the 2010 Asian Games